Sukhvinder Tinku (born 4 March 1969) is an Indian former cricketer. He played one first-class match for Punjab in 1988/89. He was also part of India's squad for the 1988 Youth Cricket World Cup.

References

External links
 

1969 births
Living people
Indian cricketers
Punjab, India cricketers
Cricketers from Chandigarh